Joaquín Jaunsolo (born 12 September 1998) is an Uruguay rugby union player who generally plays as a prop represents Uruguay internationally. He was included in the Uruguayan squad for the 2019 Rugby World Cup which was held in Japan for the first time and also marked his first World Cup appearance.

Career 
He made his international debut for Uruguay against Argentina XV on 23 February 2019.

References 

1998 births
Living people
Uruguayan people of Basque descent
Uruguayan rugby union players
Uruguay international rugby union players
Rugby union props
Rugby union players from Montevideo
Peñarol Rugby players